La fiscal de hierro is a Mexican telenovela produced by Manolo Cardona and Ana Cecilia Urquidi for Azteca Trece. The story is based on an original idea by Andrés Lópe and Juan Camilo Ferrand and written by Rosa Clemente and Raúl Prieto. It premiere on January 30, 2017.

The series is starring Iliana Fox as Silvana, Carlos Ferro as Joaquín, Raúl Méndez as Ernesto, Christian Tappán as Francisco and Alejandro Camacho as Diego.

The first season of the series was made available on Netflix on July 18, 2017.

Plot 
The series follows in the footsteps of Silvana Durán, a woman who has sworn to capture the man she is responsible for the death of her father Diego Trujillo, one of the most dangerous drug lords in the country.

Cast

Main 
 Iliana Fox as Silvana Durán
 Carlos Ferro as Joaquín Muñoz
 Raúl Méndez as Ernesto Padilla
 Christian Tappán as Francisco Miranda
 Alejandro Camacho as Diego Trujillo

Recurring

References

External links 
 

Mexican telenovelas
TV Azteca telenovelas
2017 telenovelas
2017 Mexican television series debuts
2017 Mexican television series endings
Spanish-language telenovelas